Penanti is a small town in Central Seberang Perai District, Penang, Malaysia.

See also
Penanti by-election, 2009

References

Central Seberang Perai District
Towns in Penang